Eugene "Gene" Warren Thomas (September 1, 1942 – August 27, 1993) was an American football fullback and halfback in the American Football League and played in Super Bowl I.  He attended North High School in Akron, Ohio and played college football at Florida A&M University. During his pro-career, played for the Kansas City Chiefs and the Boston Patriots.

Death
Thomas died from cardiomyopathy in his sleep on August 27, 1993 at his home in Independence, Missouri, 5 days before his 51st birthday.

References

1942 births
1993 deaths
People from Barberton, Ohio
Players of American football from Ohio
American football fullbacks
American football halfbacks
Florida A&M Rattlers football players
Kansas City Chiefs players
Boston Patriots players
American Football League players
Deaths from cardiomyopathy